Cornelis Lely (23 September 1854 – 22 January 1929) was a Dutch politician of the Liberal Union (LU) and civil engineer. He oversaw the passage of an act of parliament authorising construction of the Zuiderzee Works, a huge project – designed to his own plans – that turned the Zuiderzee into a lake and made possible the conversion of a vast area of former seabed into dry land.

Early life 
Cornelis Lely was born on 23 September 1854 in Amsterdam in the Netherlands, son of an oilseed trader. Lely went to the Hogere Burgerschool (HBS). He later studied at the Polytechnic School in Delft and graduated as civil engineer in 1875.

Career outline
Between 1886 and 1891, Lely led the technical research team that explored the possibility, later approved by a State Commission, of enclosing the Zuiderzee.

The Dutch parliament passed the law creating the Zuiderzee Works on 14 June 1918, using Lely's plan. He served three times as Minister of Transport and Water Management (in 1891–1894, 1897–1901, and 1913–1918) and in this role was hugely influential in advocating the implementation of his own plans. The scheme was finally approved and realised after severe flooding along the shores of the Zuiderzee in 1916.

In 1898 as minister he implemented a law on local railroads and tramways, which played a significant role in the development of the Dutch countryside.

In 1895 Lely became member of the Royal Netherlands Academy of Arts and Sciences. Lely was governor of Surinam from 1902 to 1905. In Surinam he achieved the initiation and construction of the Lawa Railway (from Paramaribo to Benzdorp).

Remembrance
The city of Lelystad, situated in the Eastern Flevoland polder and capital of Flevoland province, was named after him. The flags of the province and of the city are both adorned with a white fleur-de-lys to note his contribution.

In the city of Amsterdam "Cornelis Lelylaan", a major thoroughfare, is named after him and Amsterdam Lelylaan, one of the city's main railway stations, is sited on this road.

In 1905, the Surinamese village of Kofi Djompo was renamed Lelydorp in his honour; Lely having led the construction of a new railway from Paramaribo that ran through the area. Most of the railway has now gone, but Lelydorp survives and is now the capital of Wanica District. It lies on the road from Paramaribo to Johan Adolf Pengel International Airport.

A statue of Lely stands on the western point of the Afsluitdijk. It was sculpted by Mari Andriessen and dedicated on 23 September 1954, the 100th anniversary of Lely's birth. In Lelystad's city hall is a statue of Lely made by Piet Esser.

Decorations

Honorary degrees

References

External links
 
  Dr. C. Lely Parlement & Politiek
  Dr. C. Lely (liberaal) Eerste Kamer der Staten-Generaal
 
 

1854 births
1929 deaths
Canal engineers
Commanders of the Order of the Netherlands Lion
Delft University of Technology alumni
Dutch civil engineers
Dutch technology writers
Environmental engineers
Governors of Suriname
Hydraulic engineers
Irrigation engineers
Liberal State Party politicians
Liberal Union (Netherlands) politicians
Members of the House of Representatives (Netherlands)
Members of the Provincial Council of South Holland
Members of the Royal Netherlands Academy of Arts and Sciences
Members of the Senate (Netherlands)
Ministers of Economic Affairs of the Netherlands
Ministers of Transport and Water Management of the Netherlands
Municipal councillors of The Hague
Politicians from Amsterdam
Technical writers
Viaduct engineers
Water resource management in the Netherlands
Zuiderzee Works
19th-century Dutch civil servants
19th-century Dutch engineers
19th-century Dutch male writers
19th-century Dutch politicians
20th-century Dutch civil servants
20th-century Dutch engineers
20th-century Dutch male writers
20th-century Dutch politicians
Engineers from Amsterdam